William Thomas Ford (18 July 1906 – 10 May 1984) was an Australian rules footballer who played with Richmond and Hawthorn in the Victorian Football League (VFL).

Notes

External links 

1906 births
1984 deaths
Australian rules footballers from Victoria (Australia)
Richmond Football Club players
Hawthorn Football Club players